Charles Stanley Bonk (May 26, 1920 – April 20, 1976) was an American businessman and politician.

Bonk was born in Chicago, Illinois. He went to the Chicago parochial and public schools. He served in the United States Army during World War II. Bonk was involved in the insurance business and with real estate investments. Bonk was involved with the Democratic Party. Bonk served in the Illinois House of Representatives in 1953 and 1954. He also served on the Chicago City Council and the Cook County Board of Commissioners. In 1975 Bonk was found not guilty in the United States District Court on charges concerning extortion and income tax evasion. Bonk died from a heart attack at his home in Chicago, Illinois.

Notes

External links

1920 births
1976 deaths
Military personnel from Illinois
Businesspeople from Chicago
Members of the Cook County Board of Commissioners
Chicago City Council members
Democratic Party members of the Illinois House of Representatives
20th-century American politicians
20th-century American businesspeople
United States Army personnel of World War II